Bolzer See is a lake in Mecklenburg-Vorpommern, Germany. At an elevation of 31.6 m, its surface area is 0.81 km².

External links 
 

Lakes of Mecklenburg-Western Pomerania